Gladys Frazin (June 21, 1900 – March 9, 1939) was an American stage and film actress. She appeared in a mixture of American and British films.

On Broadway, Frazin played Mimi in The Masked Woman (1922). Also on stage she featured in Edgar Wallace's 1930 West End hit On the Spot.

Frazin was the daughter of Mr. and Mrs. Louis Frazin. She was married to comedian Monty Banks, her fourth husband, from 1929 to 1932, when they divorced. Her first husband was Leo Lowenstein, and they had a son, Leo Lowenstein Jr.

On March 9, 1939, Frazin committed suicide by jumping out of a window of an apartment in New York City. She was 38.

Filmography
 Let Not Man Put Asunder (1924)
 The Winning Oar (1927)
 Inspiration (1928)
 The Blue Peter (1928)
 Spangles (1928)
 The Return of the Rat (1929)
 The Compulsory Husband (1930)
 Kiss Me Sergeant (1930)
 The Other Woman (1931)

References

Bibliography
 Munden, Kenneth White. The American Film Institute Catalog of Motion Pictures Produced in the United States, Part 1. University of California Press, 1997.

External links

1900 births
1939 deaths
American film actresses
American silent film actresses
20th-century American actresses
People from Chicago
1939 suicides
Suicides by jumping in New York City